Dan O'Connor, also known by his stage names, Dan-O and Graycraft92, is an American singer, musical composer, and actor.  He may be best known for background music in movies and on television.

Biography
Dan O’Connor began studying guitar and writing songs at the age of 13. He studied music at the Hartford Conservatory and The Hartt School, where he graduated with a degree in music business and jazz guitar. In 2008 he founded DanoSongs Royalty Free Music, which gained attention for himself and his compositions, and led to his works being included on numerous soundtracks, such as the television series “The Reviewers”, the documentary “Mumbai Nights” and the movie “Waiting for Ruby”. The royalty-free service was discontinued in 2014.  Also an actor, O'Connor studied at HB Studio in New York City.

Work
O'Connor's composing clients include Disney, Harvard University, and IBM.  As a composer/actor, O'Connor contributed to such movies as "Zedic and the Crimson Born" (2012), which he also produced, "Keeping up with the Joneses: The Movie" (2013), and "Class Photo" (2013).

In 2015 O'Connor released an acoustic singer-songwriter album called "The Other Shore" on Acoustic Seed records. He performs live in the Connecticut and New York area with his rock jam band Phoenix Tree.

References

Year of birth missing (living people)
Living people
American male singer-songwriters
American singer-songwriters